Brian Vogler (born March 7, 1992) is a former American football tight end. He played college football at Alabama, and signed with the Chicago Bears as an undrafted free agent in 2015.

High school and college career
Vogler played high school football at Brookstone School in Columbus, Georgia.

ESPNU rated Vogler as the 4th best tight end and 69th overall recruit following his high school football career. In his senior year, Vogler caught 15 passes for 351 yards and 6 touchdowns, while also recording 78 tackles and three sacks playing linebacker. He participated in the 2010 Under Armour All-America Game.

Vogler played second string tight end his first season for the Crimson Tide, recording just three receptions for 27 yards. Vogler was named starter heading into the 2012 season. After taking the starting job, Vogler had 14 receptions for a total of 98 yards with 2 touchdowns.

Professional career

Chicago Bears
Vogler signed with the Chicago Bears as an undrafted free agent, following the 2015 NFL Draft. After breaking his foot during practice, Vogler was waived by the Bears on August 5, 2015.

Indianapolis Colts
On December 31, 2015, Vogler signed to the Indianapolis Colts' practice squad.

Atlanta Falcons
On January 10, 2017, Vogler signed a reserve/future contract with the Falcons. On April 30, 2017, he was waived by the Falcons.

References

External links
 Four Bama players drafted; Brian Vogler signs with Bears | University Of Alabama | Columbus Ledger Enquirer

1992 births
Living people
Alabama Crimson Tide football players
Chicago Bears players
Atlanta Falcons players